The 1980 United States presidential election in Montana took place on November 4, 1980, and was part of the 1980 United States presidential election. Voters chose four representatives, or electors to the Electoral College, who voted for president and vice president.

Montana overwhelmingly voted for the Republican nominee, Governor Ronald Reagan, over the Democratic nominee, President Jimmy Carter. Reagan won Montana by a landslide margin of 24.39%. , this is the last election in which Big Horn County voted for a Republican presidential candidate.

Results

Results by county

See also
 United States presidential elections in Montana
 Presidency of Ronald Reagan

References

Montana
1980
1980 Montana elections